Sarkar is a series of Indian political crime thriller films set in the world of Marathi politics and crime, co-produced and directed by Ram Gopal Varma. The first part Sarkar released in 2005, the second part Sarkar Raj in 2008, and the third installment Sarkar 3 in 2017.

Overview

Sarkar (2005)

Subhash Nagre (Amitabh Bachchan), known by his followers as Sarkar, lives in Mumbai. The opening scenes show a rape victim's father (Veerendra Saxena) approaching Sarkar for justice (which the corrupt law and order system has failed to deliver) which Sarkar promptly establishes by having the rapist beaten up by his henchmen. His son, Vishnu (Kay Kay Menon), plays a sleazy producer who is more interested in the film actress Sapna (Nisha Kothari) than his wife Amrita (Rukhsar). Sarkar's other, more upright son, Shankar (Abhishek Bachchan), returns from the United States with his love Pooja (Katrina Kaif) after completing his education there. Pooja's doubts about Sarkar's image cause Shankar, who firmly believes in his father's righteousness, to break up with her later in the movie.

One day, a Dubai-based don, Rasheed (Zakir Hussain) tries to strike a deal with Sarkar; he promptly refuses on moral grounds and also forbids him from doing it himself. Rasheed tries to eliminate Sarkar's supremacy with the help of Selvar Mani (Kota Srinivasa Rao), Sarkar's former associate, Vishram Bhagat and Swami Virendra (Jeeva). Meanwhile, they trap Sarkar by assassinating a righteous, upright, Ahimsa political leader and an outspoken critic of Sarkar, Motilal Khurana (Anupam Kher). Everyone, including Vishnu believe that Sarkar is guilty but Shankar has deep faith in his father. Sarkar gets arrested. Shankar now takes over the position of Sarkar temporarily. On learning of a plot to murder his father in prison, he approaches the police commissioner (Anant Jog) who mocks him and his father besides not providing protection. By the time he reaches the prison and appropriate action is taken, the attempt on Sarkar's life is already made. Sarkar is later acquitted. He remains bedridden as Shankar takes on Sarkar's enemies.

Meanwhile, Selvar Mani, Swami, Vishram and Rasheed try to convince Vishnu to murder Sarkar. Vishnu was previously thrown out of Sarkar's house because he had murdered the actor who was having an affair with Sapna. Vishnu returns home pretending to have repented. When he approaches Sarkar in the dark of the night with the intent of murdering him, Shankar foils his plan and later kills him (establishing justice by the way of his father). Shankar eliminates Rasheed, Vishram and Selvar Mani. He also succeeds in making Swami his puppet. Shankar has also realised that Chief Minister Madan Rathore (Deepak Shirke) also has a part in the attempt to end Sarkar and his rule. This results in legal action against the Chief Minister. The closing scenes show people approaching Shankar for justice and his father apparently retired.

Sarkar Raj (2008)

The sequel is chronologically set two years after the first film. Anita Rajan (Aishwarya Rai Bachchan), CEO of an international electrical power firm based in London, holds a meeting with Mike Rajan (Victor Banerjee), her father and boss and Hassan Qazi, as a seemingly shady adviser and facilitator; regarding an ambitious proposal to set up a multimillion-dollar power plant in rural parts of the state of Maharashtra in India.

Qazi states that this project will be impossible due to possible political entanglements. When Anita asks him for a solution, Qazi states that enlisting the support of Subhash Nagre (Amitabh Bachchan) (commonly referred to by his title of Sarkar), who he describes as a criminal in the garb of a popular and influential political leader, might help their cause. The resulting socio-political drama forms the crux of the story.

Sarkar 3 (2017)

In 2009 Ram Gopal Verma stated that he had no plans finalised for the third instalment in the series and shelved Sarkar 3. However, in 2012 it was reported that the sequel would go ahead once again and currently is in the pre production stage where the script is being written. The film is expected to go on floors at the end of 2013, primarily with the same cast of Amitabh and Abhishek Bachchan although his character dies at the end of this film and also Aishwarya Rai is to be left out.

In August, 2016 director Ram Gopal Varma confirmed Sarkar 3. He told on his Twitter that Abhishek and Aishwarya will not be a part of the third installment.

Cast and characters

Crew

Production 
The first film, Sarkar (2005), is often said to be a remake of The Godfather (1972).

Debutante Rajesh Shringarpore's character of Sanjay Somji in its sequel Sarkar Raj (2008) was also reportedly based on Raj Thackeray, the estranged nephew of political leader Bal Thackeray; thus furthering the general viewpoint that the series is based on Bal Thackeray and his family. Apparently Ram Gopal Verma had even shown Raj Thackeray rushes of the film to allay his fears of being wrongly portrayed.

Release and revenue

Awards and nominations

Sarkar
 Filmfare Best Supporting Actor Award for Abhishek Bachchan
 Zee Cine Award Best Actor in a Supporting Role - Male for Abhishek Bachchan
 IIFA Award for Best Supporting Actor for Abhishek Bachchan

Sarkar Raj

Star Screen Awards 

Nominated

 Screen Award for Best Film (2009)
 Screen Award for Best Director (2009)- Ram Gopal Varma
 Screen Award for Best Actor (2009)- Amitabh Bachchan
 Screen Award for Best Actor in a Supporting Role (2009)- Abhishek Bachchan
 Screen Award for Best Actor in a Negative Role (Male/Female) (2009)- Dilip Prabhawalkar
 Screen Award for Best Background Music (2009)- Amar Mohile

Stardust Awards 

Nominated

 Stardust Award for Star of the Year – Male (2009)- Amitabh Bachchan
 Stardust Award for The New Menace (2009)- Rajesh Shringapure
 Stardust Award for Best Director (2009)- Ram Gopal Varma
 Stardust Award for Star of the Year – Male (2009)- Abhishek Bachchan
 Stardust Award for Star of the Year – Female (2009)- Aishwarya Rai

Filmfare Awards 

Nominated

 Filmfare Award for Best Actor in Supporting Role (2009)- Abhishek Bachchan

IIFA Awards 

Nominated

 IIFA Award for Best Actor in Supporting Role (2009)- Abhishek Bachchan

Ametap sorkar
The Telugu sequel, titled Rowdy, in the backdrop of south Indian factionism, was released on 4 April 2014. Rowdy had also received equally positive reviews from critics but was a moderate commercial success, grossing approximately  crores in its full run.

References

External links
 
 

Indian film series
Indian gangster films
Bal Thackeray
Indian crime drama films
Indian crime thriller films
Films set in Mumbai
Indian political thriller films
Thriller film series
2000s crime drama films
2000s Hindi-language films
2000s crime thriller films
Films about dysfunctional families
Films about organised crime in India
Films directed by Ram Gopal Varma
Trilogies
Works based on The Godfather